The Canadian Wheelchair Curling Championship is the national championship for Wheelchair curling in Canada. The event has been held since 2004.

Winners

References

External links

 
Curling competitions in Canada
Wheelchair curling